Marie is a variation of the feminine given name Maria.

It is also the standard form of the name in Czech, and is also used, either as a variant of Mary or Maria or a borrowing from French, in Danish, English, German, Norwegian, and Swedish.

Compound names

Feminine

Female compound given names
 Marie-Agnès
 Marie-Andrée
 Marie-Anne
 Marie-Claire
 Marie-Claude
 Marie-Ève
 Marie-Georges
 Marie-France
 Marie-Françoise
 Marie Louise
 Marie-Madeleine
 Marie-Odile
 Marie Sophie
 Marie Thérèse

Masculine
French Marie, just as Italian/Spanish Maria, is traditionally also used in masculine compound names or more rarely as a middle name, especially in Catholic families.
 André-Marie
 François-Marie
 Jacques-Marie (disambiguation)
 Jean-Marie
 Louis-Marie
 Paul-Marie
 Pierre-Marie

People
 Marie Anaut (born 1956), French clinical psychologist and specialist in psychological resilience
 Marie Antoinette (1755–1793), Queen of France and Archduchess of Austria, who was decapitated by a guillotine during the French Revolution
 Marie Avgeropoulos (born 1986), Greek-Canadian actress
 Marie Zdeňka Baborová-Čiháková (1877–1937), Czech botanist and zoologist
 Marie Bell (1922–2012), New Zealand educationalist, lecturer and teacher
 Marie Besnier Beauvalot (born c. 1981), French billionaire heiress
 Marie Louise Marguerite Belèze (1851–1913), French botanist, taxonomist, and explorer
 Marie-Henri Beyle aka Stendhal (1783 – 1842), French writer
 Marie Cahill (1866–1933), American Broadway stage actress
 Marie-Hélène Cardot (1899–1977), French resistance leader and politician
 Marie Clements (born 1962), Canadian Métis playwright, performer, and director
 Marie Curie (1867–1934), Polish-French physicist and wife of Pierre Curie
 Marie Célestine Amélie d'Armaillé (1830-1918), French writer, biographer, historian
 Marie de France, 12th-century French poet
 Marie de' Medici (1575–1642), Queen consort of France
 Marie-Christine Deurbroeck (b. 1957), Belgian long-distance runner
 Marie Dressler (1868–1934), Canadian-American actress
 Marie of Edinburgh (1875–1938), Queen consort of Romania (1914–1927)
 Marie D. Eldridge (1926–2009), American statistician
 Marie-Eve Morin
 Marie Fredriksson (1958–2019), Swedish pop singer-songwriter
 Marie Grice Young (1876–1959), passenger on the RMS Titanic and a piano teacher
 Marie Helvin (born 1952), Japanese-American supermodel
 Marie-Noële Kelly (1901–1995), Belgian-born hostess and traveller.
 Marie Louise Jensen (born 1964), British children's author
 Marie Jepsen (1940–2018), Danish politician
 Marie Jose of Belgium (1906–2001), Belgian princess and last Queen consort of Italy
 Marie Laforêt (1939–2019), born Maïtena Marie Doumenach, French singer and actress
 Marie Laveau (1801–1881), New Orleans voodoo practitioner
 Marie Léopold-Lacour (1859-1942), French feminist activist, journalist, writer
 Marie Léra (1864-1958), French journalist, novelist, translator
 Marie Lloyd (1870–1922), English Music Hall singer
 Marie Lu (born 1984), American author
 Marie Mason Potts (1895–1978), Mountain Maidu journalist, activist
 Marie Moore (born 1967), Canadian butterfly swimmer
 Marie Orav (1911–1994), Estonian chess player
 Marie Osmond (born 1959), American entertainer and sister of the Osmond Brothers
 Marie Penny (died 1970), Canadian businesswoman
 Marie Prevost (1896–1937), Canadian actress
 Marie Rasmussen (born 1972), Danish pole vaulter
 Marie Robinson Wright (1853–1914), American journalist, traveler, historian, author
 Marie Claire Ross (born 1975 to 1976), Canadian para-swimmer
 Marie-Anne Rousselet (1732–1826), French engraver and illustrator
 Marie Saine-Firdaus (born 1973), Gambian lawyer and politician
 Marie Schlei (1919–1983), German politician
 Marie Serneholt (born 1983), Swedish singer/actress/model
 Marie Skodak Crissey (19102000), American developmental psychologist
 Marie-Lucie Tarpent (born 1941), French-born Canadian linguist
 Marie Tussaud (1761–1850), French artist known for her wax sculptures
 Marie-Louise von Franz (1915 – 1998), Swiss Jungian psychologist and scholar
 Marie Wann (1911–1996), American statistician
 Marie Wilson (1916–1972), American actress

Fictional characters
 Marie (Onegai), an anime character
 Marie Barone, a fictional character in the popular sitcom Everybody Loves Raymond
 Marie Calvet, Megan Calvet Draper's mother in Mad Men
 Marie, the lover of Meursault who is the main character in Albert Camus' novel The Stranger
 Marie, the daughter of Duchess in the 1970 Disney animated film The Aristocats
 Marie, fictional supporting character in the long-running soap opera EastEnders
 Marie, fictional character in the movie Paulie
 Marie, fictional character in the Nadia: The Secret of Blue Water anime series
 Marie, name attributed to fictional X-Men character Rogue in the films X-Men, X2: X-Men United, and X-Men: The Last Stand
 Marie Parfacy, real name of the fictional character Soma Peries in the Gundam anime series, Mobile Suit Gundam 00
 Marie Schrader, fictional character in the television series Breaking Bad
 Marie Kanker, character in Ed, Edd n Eddy
 Marie, the teenage occupant of the Velvet Room in Persona 4: The Golden
 Marie, character in the video game Splatoon and its sequels Splatoon 2 and Splatoon 3, who is Callie's cousin and one of the two members of the Squid Sisters
 Marie Jones, a character from the movie Reviving Ophelia

See also 
 Duchess Marie (disambiguation)
 Maarja, a given name
 Mary (given name)
 Máire, the Irish language form of the English language name Mary
 Maria (disambiguation)
 Marié
 Princess Marie (disambiguation)

English feminine given names 

French feminine given names
Feminine given names
German feminine given names
Czech feminine given names
Danish feminine given names
Norwegian feminine given names
Filipino feminine given names
Swedish feminine given names